Anneke is a Dutch and Low German female diminutive given name, meaning little Anna or little Anne, i.e., Annie, an alternate pet or endearing form of Anna. The given name and later surname Anneke also Annecke is a diminutive of the male short name Anno, a variant of Arno, itself derived from Arnold. Notable persons with that name include:

People with the given name 
Anneke Beerten (born 1982), Dutch mountain cyclist
Anneke Esaiasdochter (1509–1539), Dutch Anabaptist
Anneke van Giersbergen (born 1973), Dutch singer, songwriter, guitarist, and pianist
Anneke von der Lippe (born 1964), Norwegian actress
Anneke Venema (born 1971), Dutch rower
Anneke Wills (born 1941), English actress

People with the surname 
Fritz Anneke (1818–1872), German-American socialist and newspaper editor, owner, and reporter
Mathilde Franziska Anneke (1817–1884), German-American feminist and socialist

See also 
 Aneke

Dutch feminine given names